The 2016 Pulitzer Prizes were awarded by the Pulitzer Prize Board for work during the 2015 calendar year. Prize winners and nominated finalists were announced on April 18, 2016.

Journalism

Letters, Drama, and Music

References

Pulitzer Prizes by year
Pulitzer Prize
Pulitzer
Pulitzer
Pulitzer
April 2016 events in the United States